Obihai Technology is a company that manufactures analog telephone adapters that support Session Initiation Protocol (SIP), XMPP, and Google Voice compatible Internet telephony.

History 
The company, based in California's Silicon Valley, was founded in 2010 by Jan Fandrianto and Sam Sin, the same people who introduced the first analog telephone adaptors as Komodo Technology in the 1990s and formed Sipura Technology in 2002. Both prior companies were acquired by Cisco Systems, in 2000 and 2005 respectively, and integrated into that company's Linksys division. Linksys was sold to Belkin in 2013.

In January 2018, Polycom acquired Obihai. Polycom "expects to add more cloud-based capabilities and Analog Terminal Adapter solutions to its solutions portfolio". The deal is expected to close early in the first quarter of 2018. In 2022, Poly was sold onwards to HP.

Products 

Obihai is notable primarily for manufacturing analog telephone adapters that connect standard push-button telephones to the Google Voice service using a wired or wireless broadband Internet connection. As Google's voice over IP service is inexpensive (and, in some cases, free), hardware that allows the service to replace conventional landline telephony reduces costs to subscribers.

The hardware comes in various configurations, including OBi100 (1 x FXS, to connect to one phone), OBi110 (1 FXS + 1 FXO, to connect to one phone and one conventional outside line), OBi200 (1 x FXS, 4x VoIP services, T.38, USB, [wi-fi, BT optional extra]) and OBi202 (2 FXS + LAN with T.38, USB, wi-fi optional extra). The devices, distributed through US vendors such as Walmart, Newegg and Amazon, are normally sold unlocked and unconfigured. The user may configure logins for multiple, simultaneous providers.

Obihai operates its own preconfigured OBiTALK VoIP service to allow direct calling between its branded devices (using **9 and a nine-digit serial number), as well as a companion OBiON softphone app for Android and iPhone.

There is also a Service Provider Template for various individual providers (such as Anveo and Phone Power) built into the current generation of devices; earlier devices used an online wizard to automate the configuration process.

Google Voice support, a popular feature due to the low cost of service, was temporarily broken when that service dropped XMPP support in May 2014 and officially restored in September 2014. It was again broken at the end of 2017 for OBi100/110 devices due to update of Google certificates and previous end of support of Obi100/Obi100 in 2016. Later old certificates were temporary restored back by Google and service stopped again in May 2018. At the same time a community found a way to put a correct new Google certificates into Obi100/110 even without vendor support and describes it in www.obifirmware.com (anonymously).

See also 

 Cisco Systems and Linksys
 Sipura Technology
 Grandstream
 Google Voice

References 

VoIP hardware
VoIP software
Networking companies of the United States
VoIP companies of the United States